Nishada tula is a moth of the family Erebidae first described by Charles Swinhoe in 1900. It is found on the Sula Islands in Indonesia.

References

Lithosiina
Moths described in 1900